Simran Kaur Hundal is an Indian actress who mainly works in Hindi television. She made her acting debut in 2009 with Love Ne Mila Di Jodi portraying Roshni Gujral Saxena. She is best known for her portrayal of Diya Sangwan Singh in Na Aana Is Des Laado and Anamika Malhotra/Chandralekha in Anamika.

Personal life
Hundal married her boyfriend Sikandar Singh Birk on 27 November 2014 in Chandigarh.

Career
Hundal made her acting debut with Love Ne Mila Di Jodi portraying Roshni Gujral Saxena opposite Dishank Arora from 2009 to 2010.

From 2010 to 2012, she portrayed Diya Sangwan Singh opposite Varun Kapoor in Na Aana Is Des Laado. It marked a major turning point in her career.

Hundal portrayed Anamika Malhotra/ Chandralekha in Anamika opposite Mudit Nayar from 2012 to 2013 and received praises for her role.

In 2016, she portrayed a Ghost in the story "Bhootani Bani Mehmaan" on Khidki. She portrayed Parvati in Vikram Betaal Ki Rahasya Gatha in 2019.

In 2021, she made her web debut with Kuch Love Jaisa portraying Roshni opposite Aadar Malik. She has also been part of various music videos.

Filmography

Television

Web series

Music videos

References

External links

Living people
Indian soap opera actresses
Indian television actresses
Actresses from Mumbai
Year of birth missing (living people)